Babella gloria is a species of sea snail, a marine gastropod mollusk in the family Pyramidellidae, the pyrams and their allies. The species is one of twelve known species within the Babella genus of Gastropods.

Description
The shell size ranges from being as minute as 3 mm to as large as 4.1 mm.

Distribution
This marine species lies off the coast of the Philippines and other surrounding minor islands.

References

External links
 
 

Pyramidellidae
Gastropods described in 1938